The James and Lydia Canning Fuller House in Skaneateles, New York is a historic house, which on three occasions was used as part of the Underground Railway.

James Fuller married Lydia Charleton in 1815 in Bristol at the Friends Meeting House. This was the same year as the house was built.

James Canning Fuller was the secretary of the Skaneateles Anti-Slavery Society in 1838. He was a delegate to the World's Anti-Slavery Convention in 1840 in London.

The house was listed on the National Register of Historic Places in 2003.

References

Houses on the National Register of Historic Places in New York (state)
Federal architecture in New York (state)
Houses completed in 1815
Houses in Onondaga County, New York
National Register of Historic Places in Onondaga County, New York
People from Skaneateles, New York
American Quakers
19th-century Quakers
American abolitionists